Neoxenus is a genus of fungus weevils in the beetle family Anthribidae. There are about six described species in Neoxenus.

Species
These six species belong to the genus Neoxenus:
 Neoxenus ater (Jordan, 1907)
 Neoxenus corrugatus Mermudes
 Neoxenus globosus Poinar & Legalov, 2016
 Neoxenus pallipes (Suffrian, 1870)
 Neoxenus polius (Jordan, 1907)
 Neoxenus versicolor Valentine, 1998

References

Further reading

 
 

Anthribidae
Articles created by Qbugbot